Cory Bent (born 14 May 1997) is an English professional footballer.

Early life
Bent was born in Manchester and grew up in Preston, Lancashire. He began playing football at age six, and spent a year with the academy of Premier League giants Manchester United at the under-8 level. The following year, he switched to the academy of EFL Championship side Preston North End, where he played until the age of fourteen.

Club career

AFC Fylde
After a year out of the game following his release from Preston North End, Bent joined the reserve side of National League North club AFC Fylde, where he eventually signed for the first team. On 2 December 2014, Bent made his senior debut for the club as an 89th-minute substitute against Stockport County. He made a total of three appearances that season, all as a substitute.

In early 2015, Bent went on loan with Northern Premier League side Clitheroe. Bent subsequently signed with NPL side Lancaster City in August 2015 after making one appearance for Fylde in the new season. Later that season, he played for West Lancashire Premier League side Longridge Town.

Cape Breton University
In 2016, Bent moved to Canada to attend Cape Breton University, where he played varsity football for the Capers. In four seasons at CBU, Bent made 46 appearances and scored 24 goals. In 2017, he won the U Sports Championship in 2017 and was named finals MVP. He was named to the U Sports All-Canadian first team in 2018 and 2019.

In summer 2018, Bent played for USL PDL side Victoria Highlanders, scoring two goals in ten appearances. The following summer, he played for defending PDL champions Calgary Foothills, scoring two goals in nine league appearances and making one additional appearance in the playoffs.

HFX Wanderers
On 11 November 2019, Bent was selected first overall by HFX Wanderers in the 2019 CPL–U Sports Draft. On 4 May 2020, he signed his first professional contract with Wanderers. He made his professional debut on August 15 against Pacific FC. In January 2022, HFX announced they were exercising Bent's contract option, keeping him at the club through 2022. Upon the expiration of his contract after the 2022 season, Bent left the club.

Personal life
Born in England, Bent is of Jamaican descent. He is the son of former footballer Junior Bent, as well as a cousin of former footballer Darren Bent.

Career statistics

References

External links

1997 births
Living people
Association football forwards
English footballers
English sportspeople of Jamaican descent
Footballers from Manchester
Footballers from Preston, Lancashire
Black British sportspeople
English expatriate footballers
Expatriate soccer players in Canada
English expatriate sportspeople in Canada
Manchester United F.C. players
Preston North End F.C. players
AFC Fylde players
Clitheroe F.C. players
Lancaster City F.C. players
Longridge Town F.C. players
Cape Breton Capers soccer players
Victoria Highlanders players
Calgary Foothills FC players
HFX Wanderers FC draft picks
HFX Wanderers FC players
National League (English football) players
Northern Football League players
USL League Two players
Canadian Premier League players
Canadian Premier League first-overall draft picks